Matthew Scrivener (1580 – January 7, 1609) was an English colonist in Virginia. He served briefly as acting governor of Jamestown, but drowned while attempting to cross to nearby Hog Island in a storm in 1609. Eight other colonists were also drowned, half of them members of the governing Council, including Bartholomew Gosnold's brother Anthony. Scrivener was succeeded by Captain John Smith.

Scrivener was the son of Ralph or Rauff  Scrivener of Ipswich and of Belstead, in Suffolk, England, a barrister and city bailiff. He was baptized into the Church of England at St Nicholas’s, Ipswich, on 3 March 1580, at a time when infant baptism was almost always given at a few days old.

Scrivener arrived in Virginia on the first supply ship, after the colony had been established. Listed as "Matthew Scrivener, gentleman" in early Virginia records, he was a supporter and friend of Captain John Smith. At the time of his death at the age of 28, Scrivener was acting as the first secretary for the Colony of Jamestown, suggesting that he had resigned as governor, owing to his youth and lack of administrative experience, to be replaced by his friend Smith. His sister was married to the cousin of the first President of Jamestown, Edward Maria Wingfield. 

A year after Scrivener's death by drowning, his brother John Scrivener in England purchased Sibton Abbey in Suffolk, where Scrivener family descendants still live today.

References

External links 
The Second Charter of Virginia, May 23, 1609 (names Matthew Screvener, Gent.), The Avalon Project, Yale Law School Library

Further reading 
 Big Chief Elizabeth: The Adventures and Fate of the First English Colonists in America, Giles Milton, Macmillan, New York, 2001

1580 births
1609 deaths
Colonial governors of Virginia
17th-century English people
Accidental deaths in Virginia
Deaths by drowning
16th-century English people
English emigrants
Jamestown, Virginia
People from Jamestown, Virginia